Copey may refer to:
 El Copey, a town and municipality in the Colombian Department of Cesar
 the Danish krone in finance professional slang
 Clusia rosea, a tree species